Thringstone Halt railway station was a station on the Charnwood Forest Railway. Near the village of Thringstone, Leicestershire at 52.7503354N 1.3638816E. On the outskirts of Whitwick.

The station closed in 1931 when passenger services on the line with withdrawn. Today, the cutting and halt have been filled in but the bridge carrying a minor road over the halt is still visible.

References

Route 

 

Disused railway stations in Leicestershire
Former London and North Western Railway stations
Railway stations in Great Britain opened in 1907
Railway stations in Great Britain closed in 1931